Roulette is a supervillainess in the DC Comics universe.

Publication history
Roulette first appeared in JSA Secret Files #2 (September 2001) and was created by Geoff Johns and Derec Aucoin.

Fictional character biography
Roulette's grandfather was a Golden Age villain of the same name, who ran a conventional casino and fought Terry Sloane. The current Roulette believes Terry Sloane to be her grandfather, but it is indicated that her grandfather was actually Terry’s brother Ned. Both Roulette and Ned have been added into Mr. Terrific's history, and do not appear in the original stories. Having encountered the second Mister Terrific during one of her schemes, she has come to view him as an unworthy successor to Sloane. 

Her casino ("The House") is a superhuman gladiatorial arena, capturing heroes with teleporter technology similar to Holt's T-Spheres, and pitting them against each other, while various supervillains bet on the outcome.

In her debut, she captured most of the current Justice Society of America and forced them to fight each other; Mr. Terrific and Dr. Mid-Nite were forced to play a chess game where the loser would be electrocuted, Sand and Hawkman had to reach Hawkgirl while infected with a fast-acting lethal virus (for which Kendra had a single dose of the cure) while Black Adam clashed with Atom Smasher. 

However, all managed to escape their traps; Black Adam and Atom Smasher's fight lasted so long that the mind-controlling drugs used on them to heighten their hostility towards each other wore off, Sand remained in his earth form to slow the spread of the virus until another cure could be found by Dr. Mid-Nite, and Mr. Terrific and Dr. Mid-Nite managed to reach a draw in their chess game, destroying the electronic board while the game re-set itself. Roulette teleported them away before they could capture her.

A wall of fallen heroes was the only indication of the many DC Comics heroes who had been killed in battle in "The House". The names include Firebrand, Impala, Maxi-Man, Ram of the New Guardians, Flyboy and the Hybrid (minus Pteradon).

Roulette and the House reappear in Formerly Known as The Justice League, in which she captures the Super Buddies. The subliminal programming which prevented heroes escaping fails to work on Fire because her native language is Portuguese, and she releases the others. When this is followed by Mary Marvel shorting out her aggressor chip due to extreme stress, Roulette decides they have won and orders them teleported away.

One Year Later, Dr. Mid-Nite had infiltrated her current fight club location in search of information regarding purported organ-napping. She agreed to give him information only if he beat her bodyguard in a game of arm wrestling. He did so, using his knowledge of nerves and their debilitation, and though she felt he had "cheated" she gave him the name of a model who had surgically implanted wings. After Dr. Mid-Nite left, she called the owner of the surgical clinic, who later proved to be Delores Winters, and told her of the hero's investigation into the implants and operations.

Roulette is later shown to have obtained Firebug's gauntlets where she is attempting to destroy the fabled Book of Destiny, until an alien villain with a probability-based weapon steals it from her. It transpires she had been dating the thief of the book, and that she had read the book. This took a serious blow to her sanity, as she saw too much of the future to withstand the information.

Roulette later has a game going with Amos Fortune. They each play with cards that represent the JLA and the Royal Flush Gang. In turn, they each bet that one can beat the other, respectively. Eventually though, it is revealed that Roulette was merely gathering data on the JLA, Fortune, and his Gang. She is shown to be working (perhaps against her will) under the Key and his as-yet-unknown master.

Powers and abilities
Roulette has no apparent superhuman abilities, but is a genius when calculating odds and gambling winnings. Roulette has robot security dogs (designed like the guard dogs of Apokolips) automated security devices, a series of death traps and at least one metahuman on staff who can negate super-powers.

The pins she uses to tie her hair up in a bun also double as daggers for close combat.

In other media
 Roulette appears in Justice League Unlimited, voiced by Virginia Madsen. Introduced in the episode "The Cat and the Canary", this version runs an underground fight club called "Meta-Brawl" that highlights distrust towards metahumans and includes participants such as Wildcat, Sportsmaster, Bloodsport, Electrocutioner, Atomic Skull, Hellgrammite, Gork, Tracer, and Evil Star. However, she faces opposition from Green Arrow and Black Canary. In the episode "Grudge Match", Roulette reworks Meta-Brawl into "Glamour Slam" due to declining profits and utilizes Lex Luthor's Secret Society, Sonar, and mind control technology to brainwash several female Justice Leaguers, such as Vixen, Fire, Hawkgirl, Wonder Woman, and Black Canary. However, Huntress frees Black Canary and joins forces with her to free the other Leaguers and dismantle Roulette's operation before seeing her arrested by the authorities. 
 Victoria Sinclair / Roulette appears in Smallville, portrayed by Steph Song. This version is a mercenary and actress with a reputation for always completing her contracts. In her self-titled episode, she is hired by Chloe Sullivan to put Oliver Queen through a series of challenges to convince him to re-embrace his secret identity as the Green Arrow. As of the episode "Prophecy", Roulette has joined Toyman's organization Marionette Ventures.
 Roulette appears in the second season of Supergirl, portrayed by Dichen Lachman. Introduced in the episode "Survivors", this version is a wealthy socialite who secretly makes money holding illegal alien fight clubs, in which she forces the alien participants, such as her best fighter M'gann M'orzz, to fight for their freedom. Roulette continues to operate undetected until a series of violent alien-on-alien acts involving innocents draws the attention of Supergirl, Alex Danvers, Maggie Sawyer, and Martian Manhunter, with Supergirl and Manhunter convincing the fighters to live better lives and end their involvement with Roulette, who vows revenge after her fight clubs are shut down. As of the episode "Supergirl Lives", Roulette has moved to the planet Maaldoria and established a human slave trade until Supergirl and Mon-El learn of her operation and instigate a revolution among the slaves before the Department of Extranormal Operations (DEO) trap Roulette and the slavers on Maaldoria.

References

Comics characters introduced in 2001
DC Comics female supervillains
Fictional gamblers
DC Comics martial artists
Characters created by Geoff Johns